Hellickson is a surname. Notable people with the surname include:

Jeremy Hellickson (born 1987), American baseball player
Matt Hellickson (born 1998), American ice hockey player
Russ Hellickson (born 1948), American sport wrestler